Rivadavia, known officially as Ciudad de Rivadavia, is a city and the capital of the eponymous Rivadavia Department, in south-central San Juan Province, northwest of the Tulum Oasis, in the west-central part of Argentina. It is  westward from the central part of the city of San Juan, with which it forms a part of the urban agglomeration of Greater San Juan.

Rivadavia, through the approval of Provincial Law No. 6,343 of 8 July 1993, was declared a city as well as its respective limits were established.

References 

Populated places in San Juan Province, Argentina